Alceu de Deus Collares (born September 12, 1927 in Bagé) is a Brazilian politician and lawyer. He was the Governor of Rio Grande do Sul state (1991–95), and was also a member of the Chamber of Deputies and Mayor of Porto Alegre (1986–89).

He is a member of the Democratic Labor Party of Brazil.

References 

Living people
1927 births
People from Bagé
Members of the Chamber of Deputies (Brazil) from Rio Grande do Sul
Governors of Rio Grande do Sul
Mayors of Porto Alegre